The 1995 K2 disaster was a mountaineering disaster on K2 in Pakistan, the world's second highest mountain. Six people are reported to have died on August 13, 1995 on K2, largely related to bad weather, especially reported high winds. Scott Fischer was climbing Broad Peak at the time, and suggested that a contributing factor was combination of brutal cold and  winds.

An American team had gained a permit to climb  K2 in the summer of 1995. K2 is regarded as a significantly more difficult and dangerous climb than Mount Everest. Later that day, having joined with a Spanish team of mountaineers above Camp 4, New Zealander Peter Hillary, son of Everest pioneer Sir Edmund Hillary, decided to turn back, noting that the weather that had been fine for the previous four days appeared to be changing. At 6:45 p.m., in fine conditions, Hargreaves and Spaniard Javier Olivar reached the summit, followed by American Rob Slater, Spaniards Javier Escartín and Lorenzo Ortíz, and New Zealander Bruce Grant. All six died in a violent storm while returning from the summit. Canadian Jeff Lakes, who had turned back below the summit earlier, managed to reach one of the lower camps but died from the effects of exposure.

The next day, two Spanish climbers, Pepe Garces and Lorenzo Ortas (not Lorenzo Ortíz, who was killed in the storm), who had survived the storm at Camp 4, were descending the mountain suffering from frostbite and exhaustion. Before reaching Camp 3 they found a bloodstained anorak, a climbing boot, and a harness. They recognized the equipment as belonging to Hargreaves. From Camp 3 they could also see a body in the distance. They did not approach the body, so it was not positively identified, but they had little doubt it was Hargreaves and concluded she had been blown off the mountain during the storm. Lorenzo Ortas and Pepe Garces survived but had to be airlifted out, enduring six days without a tent.

List of fatalities 

Earlier in the season, Jordi Anglès died from a fall at K2.

References

1995 in Pakistan
K2
Mountaineering disasters